Hasrat Mohani Library, also known as Hasrat Mohani District Central Library, Hyderabad, and formerly known as Holm Stead Free Readers Hall, is a public library located in Hyderabad, Sindh, Pakistan, adjacent to Pacco Qillo. It is the oldest library in the city of Hyderabad.

History
The library was built in 1905 as Homestead Hall in the honor of Dr. Homestead, a well-known surgeon of Hyderabad, Sindh.

After the partition of India, Radio Pakistan set up a regional office in the library which they occupied until 1967.

In 1967, the library was renamed after an Indian poet, Hasrat Mohani.

References

Libraries in Sindh
Tourist attractions in Hyderabad, Sindh
1900s establishments in British India
Libraries established in the 1900s